Soap operas, a serialised drama produced for radio, television and internet streaming, are specifically and uniquely known for their ensemble casts and long-running characters. Many of these characters have stayed in their respective series for decades, often played by the same actor. The following is a list of the longest-serving actors from soap operas all over the world. It details those actors with ten or more years spent on one year-round or stripped soap opera, despite itinerant breaks and in some cases with the actor portraying multiple roles. 
 
As of 2023, William Roache holds the Guinness World Record for the longest-serving actor in a television soap opera, having played Ken Barlow on Coronation Street since 1960. Patricia Greene holds a similar record as the longest-serving actor in a radio soap opera, having joined the cast of The Archers as character Jill Archer in 1957.

Longest-serving soap opera actors worldwide

Current

All-time

Longest serving soap opera actors by country

Legend

Australia

Belgium

Canada

Czech Republic

England

Finland

France

Germany

Greece

Hungary

Ireland

Italy

Netherlands

New Zealand

Norway

Poland

Scotland

South Africa

Spain

United States

Wales

Notes
  Although Amar en tiempos revueltos and Amar es para siempre are two separate series, they are essentially the same show, with the latter continuing the series uninterrupted on another channel in 2012.

See also

 List of American television actresses
 List of Belgians
 List of British actors
 List of Dutch people
 List of Germans
 List of Irish people
 List of New Zealand actors
 List of old-time radio people
 List of radio soaps
 List of soap operas
 Lists of Americans
 Lists of Australians

References 

+
 
Entertainment-related lists of superlatives
British soap opera actors
Australian soap opera actors
German soap opera actors
Soap opera actors